Rani Channamma University is a public university in Belagavi established by the government of Karnataka in 2010 It was created by upgrading Kittur Rani Channamma Post Graduate Centre at Belagavi which was established by the Karnatak University, Dharwad in 1982. The university is recognised by University Grants Commission and accredited by National Assessment and Accreditation Council (NAAC). As of 2021, Rani Channamma University has been awarded "Grade B+" by the NAAC

The main aim of this university is to provide an opportunity to develop access to for higher education for students from North Karnataka Region which is deprived of good educational facilities. Rani Channamma University has the main campus, called "Vidyasangama", as its headquarters, on 172 acres of  land near Bhutaramanahatti, adjacent to the Pune–Bangalore National Highway 4 about 18 km from Belgavi city. It has been functioning with the jurisdiction of Belgavi, Bijapur and Bagalkot districts.

References

External links 
 Official Website

Universities in Karnataka
Educational institutions established in 2010
2010 establishments in Karnataka